Mutiny is a 1999 television drama film based on the story of the Port Chicago disaster during World War II where 50 African-American sailors were accused of mutiny because they declined to continue loading munitions after an explosion caused by failures in training and management.

Plot 

The film fairly closely follows the timeline of actual events as set out in the Port Chicago disaster article.

Cast 
 James B. Sikking as Lieutenant Commander Tynan 
 Michael Jai White as Ben Cooper
 Duane Martin as B. J. Teach
 David Ramsey as Vernon Nettles
 Matthew Glave as Lieutenant Kirby
 David Barry Gray as Ensign Norris
 Joe Morton as Thurgood Marshall

Reception 
The Movie Scene gave the film 3 out of 5 stars, saying that the story behind the film needs to be told, but that "an 89 minute TV movie is not the way to do it justice". He found the atmosphere lacking and the minor characters distracting from the main plot line. Diane Selkirk for Apollo Movie Guide gave the film a score of 70/100, writing that "the movie does flow well and the story comes across clearly, but it just seems weaker than you'd expect." She questioned the decision to not base any of the film's characters on actual people. She echoed The Movie Scene's sentiment that a documentary or theatrical film would be a better format to tell the story of the Port Chicago disaster.

The film was nominated for the Outstanding Music Composition for a Miniseries or a Movie Emmy at the 51st Primetime Emmy Awards.

References

External links 
 

1999 television films
1999 films
1999 drama films
American drama television films
Films directed by Kevin Hooks
1990s American films